So You Think You're Funny? (SYTYF) is an annual stand-up comedy competition for new acts. The competition began in 1988 in the United Kingdom.

The finals are held every August at The Gilded Balloon during the Edinburgh Festival Fringe. Past winners include Aisling Bea, Dylan Moran, Lee Mack, Peter Kay and David O'Doherty.

History 

So You Think You're Funny was the idea of Karen Koren, Artistic Director of The Gilded Balloon, in order to discover new comic talent. During the years it has developed into the most influential competition of its kind in the UK, helping start the careers of many of the country's leading comedians including Dylan Moran, Lee Mack, Graham Norton, David O'Doherty and Tommy Tiernan. Other competitors have included Ardal O'Hanlon, Johnny Vegas, Ed Byrne, Jason Byrne, Alex Zane, Reginald D Hunter, Craig Hill, Alan Carr, Rhod Gilbert, Andrew Lawrence and Russell Howard.

Sponsorship from Channel 4 began in 1993 and ran until 2004, since when Channel 5 and The Paramount Comedy Channel have been sponsors. Now sponsored by Foster's, the first prize is £5,000 and a place in the Best of British Show at the Montreal "Just For Laughs" Festival.

Past judges have included Steve Coogan, Owen O'Neill, Avid Merrion (Leigh Francis), Bob Mortimer and former So You Think You're Funny winners Dylan Moran and Rhona Cameron.

Comperes for the evening have included Eddie Izzard, Bill Bailey, Graham Norton and Jo Brand.

The competition spun a teenagers version entitled "Class Clowns", derived from an Australian format of the same name, which was staged at the Gilded Balloon for the first time in 2015. Judged by Jo Brand, Kevin Day and Karen Koren, the first Fringe winner was Joe Gardner.

Rules and eligibility 
The rules and eligibility are as follows:

"1. The performer cannot have performed stand up REGULARLY either paid or unpaid before 1st
June of the year prior to the competition. *

2. The performer should not have appeared in So You Think You're Funny? before.

3. The performer’s material must be completely original.

4. The performer must have at least 8 minutes of original material.

5. The organisers reserve the right to select all entrants and decisions taken by the organisers and judges are final.

6. All entrants must be aged 18 and over.

 This means you can have performed, either paid or unpaid before June 2013, but not regularly. So a handful of gigs well spaced out, once or twice, every couple of months is fine, but performing two times a week is too many. The exception to this is those who have performed as part of a recognised comedy course in this period."

Process of elimination 
The competition starts in the spring of each year with showcases in Bristol, Liverpool, Birmingham, York, Manchester, Leeds, Glasgow, Inverness, Dublin, Brighton and Nottingham as well as ten comedy clubs in London. In 2013, there were over 500 applicants for only 55 places in the Edinburgh heats.

Each showcase is not a direct competition, with judges instead selecting the best acts they have seen over the entire run to take part in one of seven heats at the Gilded Balloon at the Edinburgh Festival Fringe in August. Winners of each of these heats go forward to the final.

Winners and finalists

2022

Results:

Joshua Bethania (Winner)
Mark Black (runner up)
Jack Skipper (shared second runner up)
Pravanya Pillai (shared second runner up)
Ben Pollard
Daniel Petrie
Justina Seselskaite
Prakash Jirjadhun
Rohan Sharma

2021

Results:

Omar Badawy (Winner)
Rae Brogan (runner up)
Andy Watts (second runner up)
Phil Marzouk
Farhan Solo
Lottie Field
Kathleen Hughes
Nate Kitch
Caroline Maddison
Kathy Manuira

2019
Results:

 Finlay Christie (Winner)
 Shane Daniel Byrne (runner up)
 Charlie George (second runner up)
 Claire Haus
 Denis Len
 Erika Ehler
 Fady Kassab
 Kate Bancroft
 Kate McGann

MC Zoe Lyons Comedy Guest Judge: Jenny Eclair

2018
Results:
Danny Garnell (Winner)
Liam Farrelly (runner up)
Bec Melrose (shared third)
Joe Hobbs (shared third)
Martin Durchov
Natalie Loh
Chelsea Birkby
Patrick Healy
Shane Clifford

MC Zoe Lyons
Comedy Guest Judge: Rhod Gilbert

2017
Results:
Maisie Adam (winner)
Sarah Mann (runner up)
Morgan Rees (third)
Robin Allender
Kirsten Brown
Jamie D'Souza
Archie Henderson
Esther Manito
Eric Rushton
Amira Saied

MC: Aisling Bea

Comedy Guest Judge: David O'Doherty

2016
Results:
Heidi Regan (Winner)
Ruth Hunter (runner up)
Danielle Walker (third)
Harriet Braine
Kelly Convey
Sophie Henderson
Jamie M
Stuart McPherson
Arielle Souma

MC Zoe Lyons
Comedy Guest Judge: Alan Davies

2015
Results:
Luca Cupani (Winner)
Yuriko Kotani (runner up)
Ed Night (as Ed Day) (third)
Ben Pope
Yumna Mohamed
Neil O'Rourke
Matilda Wnek
Red Richardson
Stephen Lawson (Aka Stephen Tries)
AJ Roberts

MC: Zoe Lyons
Comedy Guest Judge: Mark Watson

2014
Results:
Aidan Strangeman (Winner)
Elliot Steel (2nd Place)
Joe Hart (3rd Place)
Mark Daniels
Jim Smith
Benji Waterstones
Eshaan Akbar
Gary Meikle

MC: Zoe Lyons

Comedy Guest Judge: Jason Manford

Sponsor: Foster's

2013
Results:

Edward Hedges (Joint Winner)
Demi Lardner (Joint Winner)
Laura Mclenaghan (2nd Place)
Andrew McBurney 
Nicky Wilkinson 
Tom Taylor 
Alasdair Beckett-King 
Russ Peers 
Jenny Collier

MC: Zoe Lyons

Comedy Guest Judge: Sarah Millican

Sponsor: Foster's

2012
Results:
Aisling Bea (Winner)
Jonathon Pelham (2nd Place)
Murdo Haggs (Joint 3rd Place)
Wayne Mazadza (Joint 3rd Place)
Ingrid Dahle
Nick Dixon
Amir Khoshsokhan
Glenn Moore
Conor Neville

MC: Jason Cook 

Comedy Guest Judge: Ruby Wax

Sponsor: Foster's

2011
Results:
Tommy Rowson (Winner)
Dayne Rathbone (2nd Place)
Lucy Beaumont (Joint 3rd Place)
Fern Brady (Joint 3rd Place)
Andy Clarke
Darren Connell
Stuart Hossack
Alex Kealy
Nicola Mantalios-Lovett

MC: Jarred Christmas

Comedy Guest Judge: Lee Mack

Sponsor: The Sims 3

2010
Results:
James Allenby-Kirk (Winner)
Liam Williams (2nd Place)
Rob Beckett (3rd Place)
Laura Carr
Alex Clissold-Jones
Pete Dobbing
Romesh Ranganathan
Matt Richardson
Chris Turner

MC: Rufus Hound

Comedy Guest Judge: Tim Minchin

2009
Results:
Ivo Graham (Winner)
Kevin Shevlin (2nd Place)
Naz Osmanoglu (3rd Place)
Richard Bowen
Robin Buckland
Jim Campbell
Kai Humphries
Winston Smith

MC: Lee Mack

Comedy Guest Judge: Tim Vine

2008
Results:
Daniel Simonsen (Winner)
Seann Walsh (2nd Place)
Sara Pascoe (3rd Place)
Gearoid Farrelly
John Gavin
Richard Perry
Ahir Shah
Daniel Sloss
Josh Widdicombe

Comedy Guest Judge: Johnny Vegas

2007
Results:
Richard Sandling (Winner)
Ben Davis (2nd Place)
Joanne Lau (3rd Place)
Carl Hutchison
James Marsh
Gar Murran
Daniel Rigby
Jack Whitehall
Toby Whithouse

2006
Results:
Wes Packer (Winner)
Hannah Gadsby (2nd Place)
Ginger & Black (3rd Place)
Alan Bennett
Caroline Clifford
Marlon Davis
Raph Shirley
Holly Walsh
Andrew Watts

2005
Results:
Tom Allen (Winner)
Sarah Millican (2nd Place)
Joe Wilkinson (3rd Place)
Charlie Baker
Kevin Bridges
Robert Broderick
Emma Fryer
Stuart Goldsmith
Josh Thomas

MC: Bill Bailey

2004
Results:
Nick Sun (Winner)
Russell Kane (2nd Place)
Chris McCausland (3rd Place)
Lee Bannard
Rob Collins
Rose Heiney
Zoe Lyons
Jarlath Regan
Susan Taylor

2003
Results:
Tom Wrigglesworth (Winner)
Andrew Lawrence (2nd Place)
Stuart Hudson (3rd Place)
Anna Crilly
Michael Fabbri
Anna Keirle
Matt Kirshen
Rodney Marques
Ed Petrie

2002
Results:
Matthew Osborn (Winner)
Mark Watson (2nd Place)
Nina Conti (3rd Place)
Michael Anderson
Andy Bone
Greg Davies
Rhod Gilbert
Rufus Hound
Greg McHugh
Ryan Gleeson

2001
Results:
Miles Jupp (Winner)
Stefano Paolini (2nd Place)
Alan Carr (Joint 3rd Place)
Michael Downey (Joint 3rd Place)
Hils Barker
John Bishop
Seymour Mace
Inder Manocha
The Reverend Obadiah Steppenwolfe III

2000
Results:
Drew Rokos (Winner)
Des Clarke (runner-up)
Mark Dolan
Jason Manford
Francesca Martinez
Mat and McKinnon
Les Hommes Sans Noms

1999
Results:
David O'Doherty (Winner)
Josie Long
Juliet Cowan
Russell Howard
Richard Morris
Andy Zaltzman
Jimmy Carr

1998
Results:
Rob Rouse (Winner)
Dan Antopolski
Kevin Hill
Reginald D Hunter
Nadine Lennard
Moz
Caroline Quinlan
Stuart Stanley
Alex Zane

1997
Results:
Peter Kay (Winner)
Nick Doody
Paul Foot
Jonathan Gunning
Stephen Morrison
TJ Murphy
Rod Woodward

1996
Results:
Tommy Tiernan (Winner)
Jason Byrne
Valentine Flyguy
John Henderson
David Keay
Patrick McDonnell
Lucy Porter

1995
Results:
Lee Mack (Winner)

1994
Results:
Martin Trenaman (Winner)

1993
Results:
Dylan Moran (Winner)
Steve Furst (Runner-up)
Michael Smiley

1992
Results:
Rhona Cameron (Winner)

1991
Results:
Alan Francis (Winner)

1990
Results:
Trio Brothers Troup (Rab Christie, Greg Hemphill and Neil Warhurst) (Winners)

1989
Results:
Phil Kay (Winner)

1988
Results:
Bruce Morton (Winner)

References

External links 
  
 The Gildedballoon.co.uk

Edinburgh Festival Fringe awards
British comedy and humour awards
Recurring events established in 1988